Mohsen Yousefi may refer to:

 Mohsen Yousefi (footballer, born 1984), Iranian footballer
 Mohsen Yousefi (footballer, born 1954), Iranian footballer